Mordellistena minutuloides is a species of beetle in the genus Mordellistena and is in the family Mordellidae, which is part of the superfamily Tenebrionoidea. It was discovered in 1966.

References

Beetles described in 1966
minutuloides
Endemic fauna of Hungary